Olde Malsters, 11 New Market Street, Usk, Monmouthshire is a remnant of a large house of late medieval origins. The existing building comprises the cross-wing and a passage from the original townhouse. It is a Grade II* listed building.

History
The architectural historian John Newman, whose Buildings of Wales:Gwent/ Monmouthshire refers to the building as ""Olde Maltsters", describes the house as "late-medieval" in origin.

Architecture and description
The building originally incorporated a hall, which now forms part of No.9, New Market Street. The building is of stone, under a slate roof, and is part-rendered in stucco. It is a Grade II* listed building.

Notes

References 
 

Buildings and structures in Monmouthshire
Grade II* listed buildings in Monmouthshire
Usk